Fanning Springs is a city in Gilchrist and Levy counties in the U.S. state of Florida. The population was 764 at the 2010 census.

Geography

Demographics

As of the census of 2000, there were 737 people, 311 households, and 198 families residing in the city. The racial makeup of the city was 89.01% White, 4.34% African American, 0.68% Native American, 0.54% Asian, 3.66% from other races, and 1.76% from two or more races. Hispanic or Latino of any race were 8.96% of the population.

There were 311 households, out of which 25.4% had children under the age of 18 living with them, 42.8% were married couples living together, 15.8% had a female householder with no husband present, and 36.3% were non-families. 29.3% of all households were made up of individuals, and 12.2% had someone living alone who was 65 years of age or older. The average household size was 2.37 and the average family size was 2.84.

In the city, the population was spread out, with 24.7% under the age of 18, 9.5% from 18 to 24, 23.7% from 25 to 44, 25.0% from 45 to 64, and 17.1% who were 65 years of age or older. The median age was 38 years. For every 100 females, there were 100.3 males. For every 100 females age 18 and over, there were 91.4 males.

The median income for a household in the city was $17,875, and the median income for a family was $24,167. Males had a median income of $25,139 versus $14,306 for females. The per capita income for the city was $11,389. About 26.1% of families and 30.5% of the population were below the poverty line, including 46.6% of those under age 18 and 19.9% of those age 65 or over.

Attractions

The Nature Coast State Trail, which follows abandoned railway lines, has a junction at Fanning Springs. Fanning Springs State Park is located just south of the center of town, along the Suwannee River. Fort Fanning Historic Park is the site of a fort that was built in 1838 to counter Native American attacks in north Florida during the Seminole Wars.

References

External links
 City of Fanning Springs official website

Cities in Gilchrist County, Florida
Cities in Levy County, Florida
Gainesville metropolitan area, Florida

Cities in Florida